BWT-Stadion am Hardtwald is a football stadium in Sandhausen, Germany. Situated in a small patch of forest near the Sandhausen town limits, it is the home stadium of local football team SV Sandhausen. The stadium is owned by the club.

History 
The stadium was opened in 1901 and was originally equipped with a clay pitch. A grass pitch was installed in 1961. The structure underwent expansion in 1987/88, when a roofed all-seater main stand was added. Further renovation works were conducted in 2001 with the addition of floodlights and in 2008 with several modifications to meet standards for the 3. Liga. These included adding a temporary stand with a capacity of 2,500, installation of a video scoreboard, expansion of press and police facilities and the building of a VIP house. Afterwards, Hardtwaldstadion could hold 10,231 spectators.

Due to the promotion of the team to 2. Bundesliga, the stadium received some more improvements during 2012 summer break. Among these were under-soil heating, a platform for TV-cameras as well as two new stands, which raised the capacity to about 12.100 spectators. If the team manages to establish itself in 2nd Liga, another two stands have to be added, backing the western goal area and the southern area, to extend the capacity to about 15.000.

External links 
 Stadium information at the SV Sandhausen website (German)

References 

Football venues in Germany
Sports venues in Baden-Württemberg
SV Sandhausen
Sports venues completed in 1951